Spring Break 6…Like We Ain't Ever is the sixth extended play (EP) by American country music artist Luke Bryan. It was released on March 11, 2014 by Capitol Nashville. The EP features six original songs co-written by Bryan. A music video was filmed for "She Get Me High".

Critical reception
Matt Bjorke of Roughstock gave the EP four stars out of five, calling it "a smart, fun collection of songs which no doubt is appreciated by his core audience." Bjorke felt that "any of these songs could’ve been part of his albums if not reserved for the annual EPs."

Track listing

Chart performance
Spring Break 6…Like We Ain't Ever debuted at number 2 on the U.S. Billboard 200 chart and at number one on the U.S. Billboard Top Country Albums chart, selling 74,000 copies in its first week of release.

Weekly charts

Year-end charts

References

2014 EPs
Luke Bryan EPs
Capitol Records EPs